Nunatsiavut is an autonomous area claimed by the Inuit in Newfoundland and Labrador, Canada. The settlement area includes territory in Labrador extending to the Quebec border. In 2002, the Labrador Inuit Association submitted a proposal for limited autonomy to the government of Newfoundland and Labrador. The constitution was ratified on December 1, 2005, at which time the Labrador Inuit Association ceased to exist, and the new Government of Nunatsiavut was established, initially being responsible for health, education and cultural affairs. It is also responsible for setting and conducting elections, the first of which was executed in October 2006. An election for the ordinary members of the Nunatsiavut Assembly was held on May 4, 2010. The Nunatsiavut Assembly was dissolved on April 6 in preparation for the election. Its incumbent president is Johannes Lampe who assumed office in 2016.

In Inuttitut/Inuktitut, Nunatsiavut means "Our Beautiful Land". This name was ratified by the Labrador Inuit Constitution and passed by the Labrador Inuit Association in 2002. A primary objective of autonomy is for the preservation of the Inuit culture and language, as well as the environment through environmental stewardship.

Nunatsiavut is counted in the census as Division 11.

Self-governance
The Labrador Inuit Association had filed a land claim for portions of Labradorian land in 1977. In 1988, the Labrador Inuit Association, the government of the province of Newfoundland, and the government of Canada began negotiations based on the land claim. An agreement-in-principle was achieved in 2001, and on May 26, 2004, the agreement  was ratified by over 75% of eligible voters subject to the land claim.

On January 22, 2005, the Inuit of Nunatsiavut signed the Labrador Inuit Lands Claims Agreement with the federal and provincial governments covering  of land, including the entire northern salient of Labrador north of Nain as well as a portion of the Atlantic coast south of there. The agreement also includes  of sea rights. Although the Inuit will not own the whole area, they were granted special rights related to traditional land use, and they will own  designated Labrador Inuit Lands. The agreement also establishes the Torngat Mountains National Park in the northern area of the land claim.

The Labrador Inuit Lands Claims Agreement is a treaty between the Inuit of Labrador, the provincial government of Newfoundland and Labrador, and the federal government of Canada, that is constitutionally protected under the aboriginal and treaty rights of Indigenous peoples in Canada granted by section 35 of the Constitution Act, 1982.

The self-governance agreement included a transfer of $130 million from the federal government in compensation for the forced relocation of the Inuit in the 1950s; $120 million to establish self-government; royalty payments from the provincial government for resource extraction; and land, mineral, and marine rights. Unspecified benefits for Inuit in Labrador not within the settlement area were also part of the agreement.

The agreement was ratified by the Labrador Inuit, the General Assembly of Newfoundland and Labrador, and the Parliament of Canada, where it received Royal Assent on June 23, 2005.

On December 1, 2005, the constitution was formally adopted, and a swearing-in ceremony was held for the first cabinet, an interim government which consisted of members of the Labrador Inuit Association board of directors. This day marked the official transfer of power from the provincial government to the newly formed Government of Nunatsiavut "to make their own laws relating to cultural affairs, education and health".

In October 2006, Nunatsiavut held its first election to form a nine-member government, which was sworn in on October 16 in Hopedale.

In 2019, there were 150 Inuit children in the care of the Department of Children, Seniors, and Social Development. An independent review, A Long Wait for Change, was completed by the province's Child and Youth Advocate at the request of the Nunatsiavut government and released in 2019. It contained 33 recommendations, including providing the support needed to transition to an Inuit-led child welfare system in Nunatsiavut.

On June 18, 2021, Nunatsiavut stated that it had begun the process of seeking devolution of child protection services from Department of Children, Seniors, and Social Development with the goal for negotiations to conclude within three years.

Nunatsiavut Assembly and Executive Council

The land claim agreement provided for the establishment of the Government of Nunatsiavut to represent the residents of the land claim area and any Labrador Inuit living elsewhere in Canada. Nunatsiavut remained a part of Newfoundland and Labrador, but the Government of Nunatsiavut acquired the jurisdictional authority over health, education, and justice in the land claim area. Nunatsiavut operates under a consensus government within the parliamentary system of Canada.

The legislature of the government is based in Hopedale, and its administrative centre is in Nain. It is subject to the Nunatsiavut Elections Act. The Nunatsiavut Assembly consists of a minimum of 16 members, including:

 a president, who chairs the Nunatsiavut Executive Council,
 ten ordinary members (one each from Hopedale, Makkovik, Postville and Rigolet; two each from Nain, the Happy Valley-Goose Bay, Northwest River and Mud Lake area, and all Inuit elsewhere in Canada)
 the Angajukĸâk (mayor) of each of the five Inuit Community Governments (one each in Nain, Hopedale, Postville, Makkovik and Rigolet)
 the Chairs of the Inuit Community Corporations.

There are currently two Inuit Community Corporations, NunaKatiget Inuit Community Corporation and Sivunivut Inuit Community Corporation, and 18 members in the Assembly.

From the Assembly, a member will be elected to act as First Minister. The Assembly would act as a forum for discussion of laws, and it will oversee the Executive Council.

The Nunatsiavut Executive Council will be appointed by the First Minister. It will implement laws, develop and implement policy, initiate and prepare legislation, oversee the administration of the government, and be accountable to the Assembly.

Inuit Community Governments were established in Nain, Hopedale, Makkovik, Postville and Rigolet. Each consists of a municipal council, elected from and by both Inuit and non-Inuit residents, and is led by an Angajukĸâk, a chief executive officer and mayor, who must be Inuk.

Large settlements of Labrador Inuit outside the settlement area will be represented by Inuit Community Corporations.

The Angajukĸâk of each Inuit Community Government and the chairperson of each Inuit Community Corporation will represent his or her community in the Nunatsiavut Assembly.

Departments
There are seven departments headed by six ministers with Nunatsiavut Secretariat headed by the President of the Executive Council.
 
 Department of Finance, Human Resources and Information Technology
 Department of Education and Economic Development
 Department of Culture, Recreation and Tourism
 Department of Health & Social Development
 Department of Lands and Natural Resources
 Department of Nunatsiavut Affairs 
 Nunatsiavut Secretariat

Wildlife, Plants, and Commercial Fisheries Co-management
Chapters 12 and 13 of the Labrador Inuit Land Claim Agreement created the Torngat Wildlife and Plants Co-management Board, and the Torngat Joint Fisheries Board.

Government buildings
While each community has government facilities, there are two key sites:

Nunatsiavut Government Head Office is located at 25 Ikajuktauvik Road in Nain and houses the administrative functions of the Government of Nunatsiavut.

The Nunatsiavut Assembly sits at Nunatsiavut Assembly Building in Hopedale. The building opened in 2012, faces Hopedale Harbour and is the first permanent home since 2008 (previous assemblies met at various locations in Hopedale).

Geography

Nunatsiavut's land claim includes the area surrounding Hamilton Inlet and the coastline north to a point south of Davis Inlet; the Mulligan River also forms part of the boundary. It also claims the land north of the Notakwanon River and as far north as Cape Chidley. Nunatsiavut is the southernmost recognized Inuit territory in Canada.

Nunatsiavut's territory consists of two geographic regions. The southern portion contains Rigolet, Makkovik, Postville and Hopedale and has a population of 1,433 (as of 2016). The northern portion contains Nain as well as the Torngat Mountains National Park. Nunatsiavut is located near the Innu communities of Natuashish and Sheshatshiu as well as North West River, Happy Valley-Goose Bay and Cartwright. It is also near the Quebec settlements of Kuujjuaq and Kangiqsualujjuaq.

Towns

 Hopedale
 Makkovik
 Nain
 Postville
 Rigolet

Land disputes
The Labrador Métis Nation (LMN) filed a challenge to Nunatsiavut's claim in the Supreme Court of Newfoundland and Labrador. The federal government has also suggested that the LMN join Nunatsiavut. The LMN's original land claim included all of Labrador south of Nain.

The Makivik Corporation had their claim to the coast between Killiniq Island and Voisey's Bay accepted in 1993 and later asked the federal government not to ratify Nunatsiavut's claims since it overlapped with their claim.

Census Division No. 11

Unorganized subdivisions
 Subdivision C
 Subdivision E

Demographics

Languages

Knowledge of official languages

Religion
According to the 2011 census, 98.73% of Nunatsiavut's residents identify as Christian. 11.25% identified as Anglican while 79.62% identified as "Other Christian" (most likely Moravian). 1.49% of Nunatsiavut's residents identified as having no religion.

Ethnic origin
According to the 2016 census, 91.8% of Nunatsiavut's residents are of Indigenous ancestry. Of the 2,350 Indigenous Canadians a total of 2,290 were Inuit, 35 were Métis and 25 were First Nations.

Nunatsiavut grants enrollment to what it defines as two different ethnicities, Inuit and the Kablunângajuit (mixed Inuit-European).

Kablunângajuit
According to the Nunatsiavut government, somebody who is a Kablunângajuk (plural: Kablunângajuit) is "an individual who is given that designation according to
Inuit customs and traditions". The Nunatsiavut government applies this designation to somebody who is either of mixed Inuit and non-Inuit descent or is not of Inuit descent but settled in what is now Nunatsiavut before 1940. Their ancestors were mainly fur traders from places such as Quebec, Scotland, Norway and elsewhere who often married Inuit.

The term Kablunângajuk means "person who resembles a white person". They were historically called terms such as "settlers" or "half-breeds". It is also sometimes used to refer to the people of the unrecognized NunatuKavut region.

The Kablunângajuit are usually counted as Inuit by Statistics Canada so their exact population is unknown. As Nunatsiavut beneficiaries, they have all the same privileges as Inuit beneficiaries in the region.

Employment
In the 2016 census, 29.9% of Nunatsiavut's population was unemployed.

Transportation
The MV Northern Ranger provided ferry service between Nunatsiavut's five communities as well as Natuashish, Happy Valley-Goose Bay, Cartwright and Black Tickle. All five settlements also have airports with flights formerly provided by Air Labrador and now served by PAL Airlines. No community in Nunatsiavut is road accessible; but there have been some proposals to connect Nunatsiavut to the Trans-Labrador Highway.

Notable people
Caubvick, namesake of Mount Caubvick
Randy Edmunds, Member of the House of Assembly for Torngat Mountains (2011-2019)
Johannes Lampe, 3rd President of Nunatsiavut (2016-)
Sarah Leo, 2nd President of Nunatsiavut (2012–16)
Mikak, one of the first Inuit to travel to, and return from, Europe in the mid 1700s.
Natan Obed, President of the Inuit Tapiriit Kanatami
Keith Russell, former Member of the House of Assembly for Lake Melville (2011–15), former provincial cabinet minister
John Shiwak, soldier
Abraham Ulrikab, former Hebron resident
Marlene Winters-Wheeler, speaker of the assembly

See also

List of proposed provinces and territories of Canada
Nunatsiavut Assembly

References

External links

Government of Nunatsiavut
Labrador and Inuit Land Claims Agreement at the Department of Labrador and Aboriginal Affairs of the Government of Newfoundland and Labrador
Labrador Inuit Land Claims Agreement Implementation Plan at the Department of Labrador and Aboriginal Affairs of the Government of Newfoundland and Labrador

Inuit territories
Inuit in Newfoundland and Labrador
Proposed provinces and territories of Canada
Regions of the Arctic
Indigenous peoples in Newfoundland and Labrador